The Trinidad and Tobago national under-16 and under-17 basketball team is a national basketball team of Trinidad and Tobago, managed by the National Basketball Federation of Trinidad and Tobago.

It represents the country in international under-16 and under-17 (under age 18 and under age 19) basketball competitions.

It appeared at the Centrobasket U17 Championship for Men.

See also
Trinidad and Tobago national basketball team
Trinidad and Tobago national under-19 basketball team
Trinidad and Tobago women's national under-17 basketball team

References

External links
Trinidad and Tobago Basketball Records at FIBA Archive

Basketball teams in Trinidad and Tobago
Men's national under-17 basketball teams
Basketball